Oleksandr Mykolayovych Nefedov (born 28 December 1966 in Zaporizhia) is a former Ukrainian football player.

References

External links
 Олександр Нефедов. www.allplayers.in.ua

1966 births
Footballers from Zaporizhzhia
Living people
Soviet footballers
FC Metalurh Zaporizhzhia players
FC Dynamo Kyiv players
FC Kryvbas Kryvyi Rih players
Ukrainian footballers
FC Torpedo Zaporizhzhia players
Ukrainian Premier League players
FC Nyva Vinnytsia players
FC Ural Yekaterinburg players
Russian Premier League players
Ukrainian expatriate footballers
Expatriate footballers in Russia

Association football defenders